"Nod Your Head" is a song by Paul McCartney and the closing track to his 2007 album Memory Almost Full. The song was released as a free download single from that album on 28 August 2007 via the iTunes Store. It was packaged with a music video for the song. McCartney played all the instruments on the song.

Following "Ever Present Past" and "Dance Tonight", "Nod Your Head" is the third song released from Memory Almost Full although it was released primarily as a free track through iTunes.

Track listing
 "Nod Your Head" - 1:58
 "Nod Your Head" (video) - 1:59

References

2007 singles
Paul McCartney songs
Songs written by Paul McCartney
2007 songs
Song recordings produced by David Kahne